Haliszka  is a village in the administrative district of Gmina Iwaniska, within Opatów County, Świętokrzyskie Voivodeship, in north-central Poland.

References

Haliszka